Roman Kravtsov (born 18 May 1995) is a Ukrainian sprinter. He competed in the 4 × 100 metres relay event at the 2015 World Championships in Athletics in Beijing, China.

International competitions

Personal bests

References

External links
 

1995 births
Living people
Ukrainian male sprinters
World Athletics Championships athletes for Ukraine
Place of birth missing (living people)
20th-century Ukrainian people
21st-century Ukrainian people